Carbon capture and storage (CCS) is a technology that can capture carbon dioxide  emissions produced from fossil fuels in electricity, industrial processes which prevents  from entering the atmosphere. Carbon capture and storage is also used to sequester  filtered out of natural gas from certain natural gas fields. While typically the  has no value after being stored, Enhanced Oil Recovery uses  to increase yield from declining oil fields.

There are no currently-operating large-scale CCS projects in Australia, although the Gorgon gas project will qualify when it is fully operational. Despite multiple CCS demonstration projects at Australian coal-fired power stations, none of Australia's coal plants are currently capturing  or have a time frame for doing so. Australian Treasury modelling finds that CCS is not expected to be commercially viable until the 2030s. The Intergovernmental Panel on Climate Change (IPCC) estimates that the economic potential of CCS could be between 10% and 55% of the total carbon mitigation effort until 2100.

In the 2017 budget, the Turnbull Government announced the cessation of the Low Emissions Technology Demonstration Fund in the 2017 financial year and the cessation of business case funding for the Carbon Capture and Storage Flagships program in financial year 2019. This is on top of the 2015 budget, where the Abbott Government cut $460m from CCS research projects leaving $191.7m to continue existing projects for the next seven years. The program had already been cut by the previous Labor government and much of the funding remained unallocated.

Challenges
 Cost of CCS will make coal-fired electricity more expensive than wind power
 Potential leakage from underground or undersea reservoirs
 Scarcity of potential sites and capacity compared to volumes of greenhouse gas needed to be sequestered on an ongoing basis
 CCS currently requires up to 30% more coal than conventional plants to cover the energy needs of CCS (although R&D is rapidly improving efficiencies), and that extra coal must first be mined (which has environmental effects) and transported to the plant (which takes energy)
 Infrastructure required would take years to build
 emissions of acid rain-causing gases like nitrogen oxides and sulfur oxides of a plant that captures  will be up to 40 percent greater than the total cradle-to-grave emissions of a modern plant that doesn't capture its  because of the extra coal burnt

Transport of  
In Australia, the major emissions sites are in the Latrobe and Hunter Valleys. The Latrobe Valley has considerable potential storage within a few hundred kilometres in Bass Strait which the CarbonNet Project was investigating (see below). There are no particularly promising large storage prospects near the Hunter Valley. Geologically prospective areas include the North West Shelf (see the Gorgon Project below) and Bass Strait. Australia has very extensive basins with deep saline formations, both onshore and particularly offshore, in which large quantities of carbon dioxide can dissolve. In such formations Australia has a potential carbon dioxide storage resource equivalent to many hundreds of years of emissions at the current rate. Work is now underway to fully assess storage potential.

Government involvement
In November 2008, the Australian Commonwealth Government passed the Offshore Petroleum Amendment (Greenhouse Gas Storage) Act 2008, which provides a regulatory framework for carbon dioxide storage in federal offshore waters.

The Victorian Greenhouse Gas Geological Sequestration Act 2008 (No. 61 of 2008) received Royal Assent on 5 November 2008. It provides a dedicated legal framework enabling the onshore injection and permanent storage of greenhouse gas substances. The state government has also developed a regulatory framework for offshore storage sites (i.e. those sites falling within the 3 nautical mile extent of state jurisdiction; the Offshore Petroleum and Greenhouse Gas Storage Act 2010.

Both Australia's state and federal governments have been major contributors to CCS research and development. Federal government CCS initiatives include the CO2CRC (founded 2003), the Low Emission Technology Demonstration Fund (2004-2017), funding for the Asia-Pacific Partnership on Clean Development and Climate (2006-2011, renewables, CCS and other), National Low Emissions Coal Initiative (founded 2008), Global CCS Institute (founded 2009), Carbon Capture and Storage Flagships (2009-2019), the Carbon Capture and Storage Research Development and Demonstration Fund (2015-2016) and the National CO2 Infrastructure Plan operated by Geoscience Australia (2012-2016).

Federal funding commitments to these initiatives total $3.5-3.6 billion, of which $1.3-$1.6 billion has been committed or is expected to be committed.

In February 2017, Prime Minister Malcolm Turnbull said:

In April 2018, a parliamentary inquiry heard from energy researchers that carbon capture and storage requires a price on carbon to be viable.

Commercial projects in operation
There are no large-scale commercial CCS projects within Australia. It previously used a one million tonnes per annum threshold.

Demonstration and proposed projects and projects under construction are listed below with brief descriptions.

Demonstration projects

CO2CRC Otway Project
The CO2CRC Otway Project in Western Victoria is a demonstration project which has injected and stored over 65,000 tonnes of carbon dioxide in a depleted natural gas reservoir 2 km below the Earth's surface. The project was first proposed to the Board of the then Australian Petroleum Cooperative Research Centre (APCRC) in March 1998. There has been no sign of leakage according to a comprehensive monitoring and verification program. A mixture of Carbon dioxide and methane gas is extracted from a well in the Bathurst field, then compressed and transported via dedicated pipeline to the Naylor field two kilometres away. The gases are then injected into the depleted gas reservoir through a dedicated injection well. A nearby well (previously used to produce natural gas) is used to monitor the injected carbon dioxide. A second stage of the project, involving evaluation of carbon dioxide storage in deep saline formations, has been highly successful and provided data on estimating  storage capacity using an innovative single well test. The project is Australia's first demonstration of geosequestration and one of the world's largest geosequestration research projects. This area has active exploration for geothermal and petroleum resources and has been supported by geotechnical work completed by the public sector and the private sector.

Post combustion capture projects in the Latrobe Valley
The Latrobe Valley Post Combustion Capture Project was a joint collaboration between Loy Yang Power, International Power Hazelwood, government and researchers from CSIRO's Energy Transformed Flagship and CO2CRC (including Monash and Melbourne Universities), involving research at both Loy Yang and Hazelwood power stations. Future trials were expected to involve the use of a range of different -capture liquids. On 9 July 2008, CSIRO Energy Technology Chief Dr David Brockway announced that carbon dioxide had been captured from power station flue gases in a post-combustion-capture (PCC) pilot plant at Loy Yang Power Station in Victoria's Latrobe Valley. The purpose of the pilot plant is to conduct research, not to capture all the emissions from the power station.

Further government projects in this area led to many geo-technical studies that review gas and liquid migration, trapping and leakage. While the Gippsland area has been described as a basin margin, this is somewhat vague. The area defines a major fold belt onshore and offshore. Multiple regional and local studies over the area have been completed by government and private companies.

In 2016, the PICA Post-Combustion Project was announced. This is a joint collaboration between CSIRO, IHI Corporation (Japanese technology provider) and AGL. It will use a pilot plant to test -capture liquids over a two-year period.

The CO2CRC/HRL Mulgrave Capture Project
CO2CRC commissioned three carbon dioxide capture research rigs at HRL's gasifier research facility at Mulgrave in Melbourne, Victoria. The CO2CRC rigs captured carbon dioxide from syngas, the product of the brown coal gasifier, using solvent, membrane and adsorbent technologies. The capture technologies are equally applicable to syngas from brown and black coal, gas or biomass fuels. During the project, researchers evaluated each technology for efficiency and cost-effectiveness. Advanced gasifier technologies are highly suitable for carbon dioxide capture for CCS as they produce a concentrated stream of carbon dioxide.

Liquid Fuel Carrier Research and Development Project
The  to liquid fuel project proposes a game changing technology for conversion of solar energy to liquid fuels. Both solar heat and solar PV electricity will be used to drive a solid oxide electrolyser device for a production of hydrogen and syngas which then can be converted onsite into transportable liquid fuels enabling large-scale energy export and storage.

Proposed projects

Gorgon gas field, Barrow Island

This project led by Chevron will be designed to capture 3.5 Mt of carbon dioxide per annum from Greater Gorgon gas fields and store it in the Dupuy formation beneath the Barrow Island. The project will be the largest carbon dioxide sequestration operation in the world. Chevron is liable for leaks and other damage during the project's lifetime and for 15 years afterwards, but in 2009 the state and federal governments agreed to indemnify Chevron against liability for the project after that time, with the Commonwealth in 2015 confirming it would adopt 80% of the liability and WA the remaining 20%.

When construction on the project began in 2009, it was expected to be completed by 2014 - including carbon capture and storage. The project ultimately started extracting gas in February 2017 but carbon capture and storage was delayed multiple times.

In May 2018, the WA Environmental Protection Authority announced an investigation into whether Gorgon could meet its storage commitments given the delays.

Fault lines compound the problems. Barrow Island is also an A class nature reserve of global importance.

Hydrogen Energy Supply Chain project 
In April 2018, the federal and Victorian governments announced a brown coal-to-hydrogen project that would operate out of AGL Energy's Loy Yang A power station. Construction is expected to begin in 2019, and hydrogen production by 2020 or 2021.

The pilot program will not include carbon capture and storage, but it is expected if the project is expanded, with proponent Kawasaki Heavy Industries says that coal-to-hydrogen technology is not commercial without it.

The CarbonNet Project
CarbonNet was established by the Victorian Government in 2009 to investigate the potential for establishing a world class, large-scale, multi-user carbon capture and storage network in Victoria. In 2012 the Australian Government selected CarbonNet as one of only two CCS flagship projects under its Clean Energy Initiative and, with the State of Victoria, awarded the project a further $100 million in joint funding to undertake feasibility. The Global CCS Institute provided $2.3 million in support.

In 2016 it was reported that "When Australia repealed the carbon price the project did not advance", but as of January 2018 the project was conducting a 17-day seismic survey of former oil wells in the Gippsland Basin.

Completed projects

Callide Oxyfuel Project, Queensland

The Callide Oxyfuel Project was the largest oxyfuel demonstration in the world when it completed its demonstration phase in March 2015. It demonstrated carbon capture using oxyfuel combustion, but did not attempt carbon storage. Oxyfuel technology enables coal to burn efficiently in oxygen (rather than air as in a conventional power station), reducing emissions and producing carbon dioxide in a more concentrated form, allowing it to be stored and extracted.

The project team assessed eight potential carbon storage sites but these were unsuitable because of location, availability and geological profile.

By capturing the CO2 produced from the combustion of the feed coal, which would otherwise be released to the atmosphere, the project demonstrated that using carbon capture technology, deep cuts could be made to power station emissions to help slow the process of climate change whilst maintaining the use of fossil fuels as major energy sources. 

The project was a joint venture partnership comprising CS Energy, ACA Low Emissions Technologies (ACALET) (now called COAL21), Glencore, Schlumberger Carbon Services, and Japanese participants J-Power, Mitsui & Co., Ltd and IHI Corporation. The project was awarded $63 million from the Commonwealth Government under the Low Emissions Technology Demonstration Fund and received additional financial support from ACALET and the Japanese and Queensland governments, and technical support from JCOAL. Total investment in the project, covering capital works and operations and maintenance was $250 million. It was a project for the Asia-Pacific Partnership on Clean Development and Climate.

The Callide Oxyfuel Project demonstrated the production of electricity from coal with almost no power station emissions to the atmosphere by capturing a major portion of the flue gas CO2 as liquefied gas, and other waste gases such as oxides of nitrogen (NOx), oxides of sulphur (SOx), and heavy metals in condensate form. The project involved the following key technologies and activities:

 oxyfuel combustion of coal to achieve a 60 percent to 70 percent reduction in the actual volume of flue gas and a proportionate increase in the CO2 concentration, from around 20% to around 80%. For a new build power station, it is believed that his value would be further increased to around 95%.
 cryogenic separation and recovery of industrial grade CO2 from the power station flue gas stream, which could either be partially utilised in industry or potentially in enhanced oil recovery (EOR), which assists in maximising oil production from an oil well.
 assessment of CO2 storage capacity in Queensland, and injection testing of Callide Oxyfuel CO2.

The project demonstrated more than 10,000 hours of oxy-combustion and more than 5,000 hours of carbon capture.

The Callide Oxyfuel Project demonstrated that new technology could be applied to an old power station to produce cleaner electricity. Built in the 1960s, the Callide A Power Station near Biloela in Central Queensland was chosen as the project’s demonstration site. Retrofitting the Callide A Power Station with oxyfuel technology represented a low-risk and cost- and time-effective way to demonstrate clean coal technology on an industrial scale, and represented a new stage in the station’s history.

In 2017, Martin Moore, chief executive officer of project proponent CS Energy said of the Callide project:

International Power Carbon Capture Plant, Victoria (Hazelwood 2030) 
A post-combustion capture plant operated at the International Power GDF Suez Hazelwood Power Station Hazelwood.

When announced in 2007, the project was originally planned as a retro-fit of one of Hazelwood's eight generating units, which would have reduced its emissions intensity by 20% (500,000 tonnes per annum). It was offered a $50 million federal government grant from the Low Emissions Technology Development Fund and a $30 million Victorian government grant from the Energy Technology Innovation Strategy.

A pilot program with a more modest capture objective was completed. The solvent capture plant cost $10 million (including grants from state and federal governments) and began operation in 2009, capturing and chemically sequestered  at a nominal rate of 10,000 tonnes per annum.

Hazelwood Power Station closed in March 2017.

Delayed projects

Monash coal-to-liquids
On 2 December 2008 Shell and Anglo American announced that this possible brown coal project in the Latrobe Valley will not proceed at present. They have described it as a "long term" opportunity.

The planned project was planned to have some CCS, storing the gas captured in depleted off-shore oil fields in the Gippsland Basin in east Bass Strait.

Cancelled projects

BP Kwinana (WA) coal to gas plant

Zerogen power station
The Zerogen powerstation project near Stanwell power station in Queensland is proposed to be a 100 MW "Integrated Gasification Combined Cycle" power station with CCS. In late 2010, the Government of Queensland announced it would not fund the Zerogen project because it was not economically viable and that it would be sold off.

Fairview project
The Fairview Project, near Roma in South West Queensland, was intended to capture 1/3 of the  emissions from a 100 MW coal seam methane gas-fired power station. In 2006 it was selected to receive federal government funding, but as of September 2017 it does not appear on the Global CCS Institute's list of projects.

See also

 Coal mining in Australia
 Emissions trading
 Mandatory renewable energy targets
 Mitigation of global warming in Australia
 Renewable energy commercialization in Australia

References

Energy in Australia
Climate change in Australia
Australia